Debra Ann Stock (born 17 July 1962) is a former English international cricketer.  A right-handed batter and right-arm off break bowler, she played in seven Test matches and fifteen One Day Internationals for England between 1992 and 1996, and was part of the squad that won the World Cup in 1993. She played domestic cricket for Thames Valley and Berkshire.

References

External links
 

1962 births
Living people
Cricketers from Oxford
England women Test cricketers
England women One Day International cricketers
Thames Valley women cricketers
Berkshire women cricketers